Colombiers is a commune in the Cher department in the Centre-Val de Loire region of France.

Geography

The Point of Inaccessibility for France (furthest point from any border) lies in Colombiers at 46° 41.925’ N, 2° 32.457’ W.

Population

Sights
 The thirteenth-century church of St. Martin.
 The fifteenth-century castle, the chateau of La Salle
 A watermill, le moulin du Bas.
 A seventeenth-century stone cross.

See also
Communes of the Cher department

References

Communes of Cher (department)